Eladio Loizaga Caballero (born 17 March 1949) is a Paraguayan lawyer and diplomat.

Biography
Loizaga studied law at the Universidad Nacional de Asunción, where he graduated in 1973; he devoted himself to the areas of International Law, Civil Law, International Trade and Intellectual Property. He worked at the Ministry of Foreign Affairs; he was one of the local promoters of the World Anti Communist League. From 1989 to 1992, he served as Cabinet Head of Staff for Gral. Andrés Rodríguez Pedotti. He also served as legislator and Paraguayan Representative to the United Nations and WTO.

On 15 August 2013, he was sworn in as Foreign Minister of Paraguay in the cabinet of President Horacio Cartes.

Loizaga is one of several prominent beneficiaries of ill-gotten lands in Paraguay. These lands were destined for agrarian reform but were illegally handed to loyalists of the Stroessner military dictatorship. He claims ownership of more than 8.000 hectares of land handed to him in this manner despite not possessing the proper papers and title documents. He has been accused of being a prominent figure behind Operation Condor, a US backed anticommunist campaign of political suppression and state terror.

Honours 
 2017: Knight Grand Cross in the Order of Isabella the Catholic.

See also
 List of foreign ministers in 2017

References

External links
  

1949 births
Foreign Ministers of Paraguay
Knights Grand Cross of the Order of Isabella the Catholic
Living people
Paraguayan people of Basque descent
Paraguayan diplomats
20th-century Paraguayan lawyers
Permanent Representatives of Paraguay to the United Nations
Universidad Nacional de Asunción alumni